The Oviatt House is located in Oshkosh, Wisconsin.

History
The house was designed by Waters and built in 1883 for Moses Hooper. Hooper was an Oshkosh attorney who represented Kimberly-Clark among others, and was such an authority on riparian rights that he appeared before the US Supreme Court repeatedly. In 1900 the house was bought by Dr. Charles Oviatt, a noted surgeon who insisted that nuns assisting in surgery wear sterilized garb rather than woolen habits, and eventually received a letter of agreement from Pope Leo XIII.

After Oviatt's death, the house was purchased by what is now the University of Wisconsin-Oshkosh. The school has used it as a girl's dormitory, the president's residence and a charity headquarters. In 1979, the house was listed on the National Register of Historic Places and it was also listed on the State Register of Historic Places in 1989.

It is located in the Oshkosh State Normal School Historic District.

References

Houses on the National Register of Historic Places in Wisconsin
National Register of Historic Places in Winnebago County, Wisconsin
University of Wisconsin–Oshkosh
Houses in Winnebago County, Wisconsin
Buildings and structures in Oshkosh, Wisconsin
Gothic Revival architecture in Wisconsin
Limestone buildings in the United States
Houses completed in 1883